Tyra is a female given name. It may refer to:

People
Tyra Banks (born 1973), American television personality
Tyra Bolling (born 1985), American singer
Tyra Calderwood (born 1990), Australian tennis player
Tyra of Denmark (died 1000 AD), 10th-century Danish princess
Tyra Ferrell (born 1962), American actress
Tyra Gittens (born 1998), Olympic athlete from Trinidad and Tobago
Tyra Grant (born 1988), American basketball player
Tyra Hunter (1970-1995), African-American transgender woman
Tyra Kleen (1874-1951), Swedish artist
Tyra Naha, Hopi American potter
Tyra Perry, American softball coach
Tyra Sanchez (born 1988), American drag queen
Tyra Shackleford, Chickasaw textile artist
Tyra Turner (born 1976), American beach volleyball player
Tyra Vaughn (1923-2015), American actress 
Tyra White (born 1989), American basketball player
Tyra Wolfsberg, American bioinformatician 
Tyra of Sweden, daughter of the Norse noble Styrbjörn the Strong

Fictional characters
Tyra Collette, a fictional character on the television series Friday Night Lights
Tyra Hamilton, a fictional character on the CBS soap opera The Young and the Restless
Tyra Nordbo, a character from the Man-Kzin Wars book series
 Tyra Ragnarsdottir, a character from The Saxon Stories book series and The Last Kingdom TV series

See also
Thyra (given name)

English feminine given names